Podocarpus guatemalensis is a species of conifer in the family Podocarpaceae. Its common names include ocotillo de llano, cypress de montaña, cipresillo, alfajillo, pinillo, palo de oro, and piño de montaña.

Distribution
Podocarpus guatemalensis is a shrub and/or small tree found in namesake Guatemala, and also from southern Mexico through Belize, Costa Rica, El Salvador, Honduras, Nicaragua and Panama in Central America, to Venezuela and Colombia in northern South America.

Podocarpus guatemalensis is a species of least concern on the IUCN Red List. Some populations are threatened by habitat destruction, but some occur in protected areas.

References

guatemalensis
Flora of Central America
Flora of northern South America
Flora of Chiapas
Flora of Oaxaca
Flora of Guatemala
Least concern flora of North America
Taxonomy articles created by Polbot